General elections were held in Costa Rica on 7 February 2010.  The ruling party before the election, the center-left National Liberation Party, put forward former Vice-President Laura Chinchilla as its presidential candidate, while the libertarian, Movimiento Libertario nominated former legislator Otto Guevara.   Opinion polls before voting started consistently put Chinchilla as the front-runner, a trend confirmed in the election-night count, which showed her garnering 46.76% of the vote.

The election was supervised by observers from several countries, as well as from the Organization of American States.  The incumbent president, Óscar Arias, was ineligible to run for a second consecutive term. This was the last time as of 2019, that the National Liberation Party has gotten more than 30% of the vote, the last time to this date that they have won the Presidency, and the last time it has won any province in what is known as the Central Valley (the four provinces in the interior of the country: San José, Alajuela, Heredia and Cartago).

Presidential candidates

Candidates included:

Laura Chinchilla Miranda (ruling National Liberation Party, vice-president 2006–08)
Ottón Solís (oppositional Citizens' Action Party, candidate in 2006)
Otto Guevara (Movimiento Libertario, candidate in 2006)
Luis Fishman (conservative Social Christian Unity Party, vice-president under Abel Pacheco)

Two weeks before the election, Patriotic Alliance and National Integration Party's candidates, Rolando Araya and Walter Muñoz, stopped their campaigns and endorsed Citizens' Action Party's candidate Otton Solís, in an effort to build a progressive alliance against Laura Chinchilla.

Parliamentary elections
The swifting from a two-party system to a multi-party system was much more evident in this election

For the then three major parties; PLN, PAC and ML the voting for the presidential ballot was superior to the support in the legislative, as for example PLN presidential candidate Laura Chinchilla received 46% of the votes and PLN's legislative ballot only 37%. Similarly PAC's candidate Ottón Solís with 25% presidential against 17% legislative and Otto Guevara with 20% oppose to 14% legislative. Contrary to PUSC whose candidate Luis Fishman received 3% electoral support while his party received 8%.	

This was at the time PAC's worst electoral result in its history having the smallest faction in the Parliament and ML's best result with to this date its biggest. PLN only lost one seat. Left-wing Broad Front maintained its only seat in the person of future presidential nominee José María Villalta Florez-Estrada and two Christian parties for the first time had deputies at the same time; Costa Rican Renewal Party and its provincial offshoot National Restoration.

Opinion polling

CID-Gallup 24 January 2010: Chinchilla 43%; Guevara 30%; Solís 15%; Fishman 8%
Borge & Asociados for Diario Extra opinion poll January 2010: Chinchilla 38.7%; Guevara 18.3%; Solís 9.6%; Fishman 3.7%
Demoscopía for Al Día January 2010: Chinchilla 45.1%; Guevara 30.1%; Solís 9.5%; Fishman 3.8%
December 2009: Chinchilla 36.7%; Guevara 16.2%; Solís 8.5%; Fishman 2.2%
December 2009: Chinchilla 46.6%; Guevara 19.5%; Solís 8.3%; Fishman 4.1%
October 2009: Chinchilla 53.0%; Guevara 15.7%; Solís 12.3%; Fishman 1.5%

Results

President
At 9:08 p.m. local time on election day, 7 February second-placed candidate Otton Solis conceded defeat to Laura Chinchilla, who will become Costa Rica's first female president. With approximately 40% of the vote counted, Chinchilla was consistently surpassing the 40% threshold for victory in the first round, leading Solis by 47% to 24%, with third-placed candidate Otto Guevara trailing at 21.5%.

By province

Legislative Assembly

By province

Municipal Councils

The elections of municipal councilors of Costa Rica in 2010 were an electoral process held in parallel with the presidential and legislative elections. In them the 495 tenure aldermen and the 495 alternates that conform the 81 Municipal Councils were chosen.

The Central Canton of San José, the most populous, named 13 aldermen. Desamparados and Alajuela named 11. Others less populated (Puntarenas, Limón, Pococí, Heredia, Cartago, La Unión, San Carlos, Goicoechea, Pérez Zeledón, etc.) named 9. Others even smaller (Tibás, Grecia, Vázquez de Coronado, Montes de Oca, Siquirres, Escazú, Turrialba, etc.) appointed 7 council members. Finally, the smallest (Turrubares, San Mateo, Santa Ana, Mora, Montes de Oro, Talamanca, etc.) named 5.

References

Bruce M. Wilson and Juan Carlos Rodríguez-Cordero: "The general election in Costa Rica, February 2010". In Electoral Studies, Volume 30, Issue 1, March 2011, pages 231-234.

Elections in Costa Rica
Costa Rica
2010 in Costa Rica
February 2010 events in North America